Adnan Al Rajeev is a Bangladeshi director, producer and scriptwriter. He is mostly known for directing television commercials and producing television dramas.

Education and career 
Adnan completed his education in West Bengal, India. On returning to Bangladesh, he was luckily introduced to a famous Bangladeshi director Mostofa Sarwar Farooki, who is also the founder of Chabial, an old and successful production house. Adnan joined Chabial as an assistant director to Farooki. He spent quite a few years learning how to give direction and later moved on to establishing his own production house " Runout Films". Under the leadership of Adnan, Runout has now become a major production house in Bangladesh. 
Adnan Al Rajeev has made over a hundred television commercials for brands such as Unilever, Orascom, Xpress Money, Telenor, Axiata, Airtel, Glasgow Smith Kline, LG, and Samsung.

Apart from TV commercials, Adnan has directed television fiction. Among many of his television dramas, @18: All Time Dourer Upor and Bikal belar pakhi were the most successful.

References

External links 
 
 
  - egiye-cholo.com

1987 births
Living people
Bangladeshi directors
Bangladeshi film producers
Bangladeshi screenwriters